Balamban, officially the Municipality of Balamban,  is a 1st class municipality in the province of Cebu, Philippines. According to the 2020 census, it has a population of 95,136 people.

Mount Manunggal in Barangay Magsaysay (formerly Sunog), is the site of the plane crash on March 17, 1957 in which President Ramon Magsaysay and 17 of his presidential staff and news correspondents were killed.

History

Balamban became a town "pueblo" in 1745. A Spanish document attests that the community was recognized as a town during Spanish colonial period. The first administrator was Ciriaco Gutierrez, a Spanish captain.

Cityhood

House Bill No. 1574 was filed last July 8, 2019, for the conversion of the municipality of Balamban into a component city in the province of Cebu. The bill is currently pending with the committee on local government since July 24, 2019.

On July 5, 2022, House Bill No. 1018 was filed by Rep. Pablo John Garcia which seeks to convert the municipality of Balamban to be known as the City of Balamban.

Geography
Balamban is bordered to the north by the town of Asturias, to the west is the Tañon Strait, to the east is Cebu City, and to the south is the City of Toledo.

Barangays

Balamban comprises 28 barangays:

Climate

Demographics

Economy

The biggest economic driver in Balamban is the West Cebu Industrial Park (WCIP), a 540-hectare mixed-use development in Balamban. It is owned and managed by AboitizLand and is anchored by a 283-hectare industrial park, a Philippine Economic Zone Authority (PEZA)-registered economic zone tagged as the "Shipbuilding Capital of the Philippines". It hosts 11 locators from medium to heavy industries and employs 14,000 skilled workers.

Located in WCIP in Barangay Buanoy is Tsuneishi Heavy Industries (Cebu), Inc. (THICI). It builds merchant ships of up to 180,000 deadweight tons using the same high quality shipbuilding technologies and standards as those in Tsuneishi Japan. Also located in WCIP in Barangay Arpili is Austal Philippines Pty. Ltd. which caters to market demands for high speed ferries, workboats, fast crew transfer boats, other commercial vessels and defense vessels.

Other locators include Aboitiz Construction, Air Liquide, Linde, Balamban Enerzone, Mactan Rock Industries, Inc. Tsuneishi Holdings, Tsuneishi Technical Services (Phils.), Inc., K & A Metal Industries, Inc.  Shillon Global Construction, Inc., and Advanced Composites Group,

There are two shopping malls in the municipality, the Gaisano Town Center Balamban and Gaisano Grand Balamban.

A number of banks and financial institutions are operating in Balamban. These include Metrobank, RCBC, Landbank, City Savings Bank, BDO Network Bank, Rizal MicroBank, Banco Maximo, and Sugbuanon Rural Bank.

The Transcentral Highway (TCH) is a national road running through the mountains between Balamban and Cebu City and connects the two localities. It is popular by road trippers, bikers, and riders for its scenery, cold climate, restaurants, and cafes.

References

External links

 [ Philippine Standard Geographic Code]

Municipalities of Cebu